Civetta is Italian for "owl". It may also refer to:

Names 

 Il Civetta, alias of Flemish Northern Renaissance and Mannerist landscape painter Herri met de Bles (c. 1490 – 1566)
 Michele Civetta (born 1976), Italian film director
 Nick Civetta (born 1989), American professional rugby player
 Santiago Civetta (born 1998), Uruguayan rugby player

Other 

 Civetta (contrada), one of the 17 contrade districts of Siena, Italy
 Civettictis civetta, a large viverrid native to sub-Saharan Africa
 Monte Civetta, major mountain of the Dolomites in northern Italy
 Civetta, a fictional car brand based on Ferrari, appears in the videogame BeamNG.drive